The 1936 European Figure Skating Championships were held in Berlin, Germany. Elite senior-level figure skaters from European ISU member nations, as well as Japan, competed for the title of European Championin the disciplines of men's singles, ladies' singles, and pair skating.

Results

Men

Ladies

Pairs

References

External links
 results

European Figure Skating Championships, 1936
European Figure Skating Championships, 1936
European Figure Skating Championships
European 1936
European Figure Skating Championships, 1936
Sports competitions in Berlin
1930s in Berlin